Rokycany is a village in Prešov District in the Prešov Region in East Slovakia.

History
In historical records the village was first mentioned in 1295.

Geography

Population 
It has a population of about 1,062 people (2020-12-31).

Notable people
Hungarian politician János Gyöngyösi, who served as Minister of Foreign Affairs between 1944 and 1947.

References 

Villages and municipalities in Prešov District
Šariš